"Electric" is a song by American singer Katy Perry released on May 14, 2021, through Capitol Records, as the second single of the Pokémon 25 soundtrack album. It is an electropop ballad written by Perry, Jon Bellion, Lucas Marx, Oliver Peterhof, Rachel Kanner, Al Calderon, Bruce Wiegner, and Jordan Johnson and Stefan Johnson of the Monsters & Strangerz, with production being handled by the latter three alongside German.

Accompanying video was directed by Carlos López Estrada. In it, Perry and Pikachu assist younger versions of themselves. The younger version of Perry is played by Meili Aspen Caputo. Commercially, "Electric" was a minor success, charting at low positions of Billboard-published Canadian Hot 100 and Global 200. It entered digital component charts in the United States and Germany.

Background and composition
On January 13, 2021, it was announced that the celebration of the 25th anniversary of Japanese media franchise Pokémon would commence with a musical collaboration with Perry. Describing herself as a "lifelong Pokémon fan", she stated that "In this moment of unknown, there are dependable places and characters and institutions and people, and I hope I can be one of them. That's what I hope for in my personal self, and even in my involvement with this collab." On May 10, 2021, the singer officially announced the single's title and release date through her social media accounts.

Perry later told MTV that she was asked to write an empowerment anthem, and explained her philosophy regarding writing songs: "Some people write only heartache songs or sexy songs or a combination. And my lane seems to be the 'you can do it, ignite your light' empowerment. It's all within, you know? That's a message I love standing by." "Electric" was structured as an electropop ballad composed in the C major key. It talks about the joy that comes after achieving life goals with the help of friends. It was written by Perry, Jon Bellion, Lucas Marx, Oliver Peterhof, Rachel Kanner, Bruce Wiegner, Jordan Johnson and Stefan Johnson. It was produced by the Monsters & Strangerz, Wiegner and German. Perry's vocals spans from G3 to D5.

Release and promotion
"Electric" was released to digital download and streaming on May 14, 2021. It was released to Italian radios at the same day. The song serves as the second single of Pokémon 25: The Album after Post Malone's cover of "Only Wanna Be with You". An "Electric" compact disc single is available to buy on the official Pokémon 25 site, and was released on June 25. Additionally on the same page, pieces of merchandise inspired by the single are also sold. Additionally, "Electric" was included on the Netflix film soundtrack of He's All That (2021).

Reception
Halle Kiefer of Vulture said that it follows "in the well-trod footsteps of 'Roar' and 'Firework'", describing all three of them as "inspirational pop ballads". A staff review from Billboard wrote that the song "sees Perry return to anthemic pop." MTV's Patrick Hosken called the song "belt-ready bop." In an article published by Universal Music Poland, the writer said the song "makes [the listener] immediately charged with the positive energy, in keeping with the song's title."

Chart performance
In the United States, "Electric" debuted at number 25 on Digital Song Sales chart. Elsewhere, it managed to peak at number 97 on Canadian Hot 100, 120 on Global 200 and 112 on Global 200 Excluding U.S. charts. In Latin American countries, the song charted within top 20 of Ecuador, El Salvador, Panama and Uruguay English charts. Jack White of Official Charts Company listed "Electric" as one of the songs responsible for driving 20% of CD single sales year-on-year, together with songs from artists such as Ed Sheeran, Olivia Rodrigo, Cardi B, and Coldplay among others.

Music video

Development and release

The music video was directed by Mexican-American filmmaker Carlos López Estrada, written by Estrada, Doug Klinger and Perry, with Klinger beinger executive producer, and Santiago Gonzales being director of photography. It was recorded on Hawaiian island Oahu in such locations as Diamond Head Lighthouse and Kualoa Ranch. United States Coast Guard approved shooting on the island. Perry told MTV said that one of the ideas behind the music video was a "reminder of her trying to figure out who she wanted to be as a teenage artist performing under her given name, Katheryn Hudson." Singer also added that she chose Hawaii as clip's location because it "provided the perfect lush and naturalistic surroundings." Shooting took two 12-hour days.

Before the shooting, the production team was looking for a "girl with blonde hair and blue eyes that could play the guitar." Meili Aspen Caputo was finally cast to play the younger version of the singer in the video. The actress said that her mother received a phone call from the production team, and after a hair color change, Caputo played in the music video. During an interview with MidWeek magazine, the actress shared that being on the set was a "fun" experience. Perry also mentioned: "[Caputo] put her hair in pigtails and she looks identical to this one from that video I have of me playing."

Good Morning America shared a thirty-second sneak peek of the "Electric" music video on May 13, 2021, which premiered in full the following day. The behind-the-scenes video was published on Perry's official YouTube channel on June 7, 2021.

Synopsis and reception
The video starts with Perry and Pikachu hanging out in Hawaii. The two stop at Diamond Head Lighthouse and enjoy the view while in meditation. While they are meditating, they travel back in time. They encounter the younger versions of themselves, who are performing at the farmer's marketplace. The older version of Perry subtly manipulates the marketplace to help the younger version of herself find her style in music. Afterwards, she gets her younger version to join a talent competition being held at the island. By the end of the video, the younger version of Perry gives her first club performance as the older version of Perry and Pikachu looks on from the crowd until they wake up from their meditation.

Entertainment Weeklys Joey Nolfi and Pure Chart's Yohann Ruelle described the music video as "adorable." Halle Kiefer from Vulture stated that Pichu is the video's highlight. Patrick Hosken of MTV written that this song "needed a locale as large as its sound."

Credits and personnel

Song credits
Credits adapted from Tidal and CD single.

Publishing and recording locations
 Published by When I'm Rich You'll Be My Bitch/WB Music Corp/Songs Of A Beautiful Mind/Art In The Fodder Music/BMG Chrysalis/Kobalt Music Copyrights SARL/1916 Publishing/BBMG Music/Kobalt Songs Music Publishing/BMG Platinum Songs/R8D Music/Songs of BBMG Publishing/Bruce Weigner publishing designee/Lucas Marx Music
 Recorded at Unsub Studios, Los Angeles, and Secret Garden Studios, Santa Barbara, California
 Mixed at MixStar Studios, Virginia Beach, Virginia
 Mastered at The Mastering Palace, New York, New York

Personnel

 Katy Perry vocals, songwriting
 Bruce Wiegner songwriting, production, co-production, programming
 The Monsters & Strangerz production, programming
 Jordan K. Johnson songwriting
 Stefan Johnson songwriting
 German production, programming
 Bart Schoudel vocal production, programming
 Jon Bellion songwriting
 Lucas Marx songwriting
 Oliver Peterhof songwriting
 Rachel Kanner songwriting
 Rachael Findlen engineering, recording, studio personnel
 Serban Ghenea mixing, studio personnel
 John Hanes mixing engineering
 Dave Kutch mastering

Music video credits
Credits adapted from music video's promotional poster.

 Carlos López Estrada writing, directing
 Doug Klinger writing, executive production
 Katy Perry writing, starring
 Nicole Jordan Webber production
 Andrew Chennisi production
 Yusef Chabayta production
 Maverick Media animation
 Targa Sahyoun commission
 Anna Heinrich head of production
 Vance Lorenzini production designer
 Santiago Gonzales photography direction
 Julian Conner postproduction
 Cami Starkman edition
 Meili Aspen Caputo starring

Charts

Release history

References

2020s ballads
2021 songs
2021 singles
Electropop ballads
Katy Perry songs
Songs written by Katy Perry
Songs written by Jon Bellion
Song recordings produced by the Monsters & Strangerz
Capitol Records singles
Songs from Pokémon
Songs written by Jordan Johnson (songwriter)
Songs written by Stefan Johnson